Pristimantis turpinorum is a species of frog in the family Strabomantidae.

It is endemic to the north-eastern part of the island of Tobago in The Republic of Trinidad and Tobago. 
Its natural habitat is tropical moist lowland forests.

References 

turpinorum
Endemic fauna of Trinidad and Tobago
Amphibians of Trinidad and Tobago
Frogs of South America
Amphibians described in 2001
Taxonomy articles created by Polbot